God Seed was a Norwegian black metal band based in Bergen, Norway. Former Gorgoroth members Gaahl and King ov Hell adopted the name in March 2009 following the ending of the Gorgoroth name dispute. After performing a few gigs as God Seed, vocalist Gaahl left the band in July 2009 and it was put on hold. King finished the music for God Seed's first album, with vocalist Shagrath, and released it under the name Ov Hell. Gaahl re-joined God Seed in 2012. In January that year they released the live album Live at Wacken, and in October they released their first studio album, I Begin.

History 

God Seed’s roots hearkened to the band Gorgoroth and the Gorgoroth name dispute, when longtime Gorgoroth members Gaahl and King ov Hell attempted to remove founding member Infernus from the band in October 2007. Gaahl and King had joined Gorgoroth in 1998 and 1999 respectively, performing on the albums Incipit Satan (2000), Twilight of the Idols (2003), and Ad Majorem Sathanas Gloriam (2006). The two musicians wrote most of Twilight of the Idols and the entire Ad Majorem Sathanas Gloriam album. Gaahl also performed vocals on the title track of Destroyer (1998).

Following the conclusion of the Gorgoroth dispute in March 2009, when the court recognised Infernus as the legitimate owner of the band name, Gaahl and King assumed the name God Seed. This was the name of a song (originally intended to be the title track of Twilight of the Idols) on Ad Majorem Sathanas Gloriam.

While using the name Gorgoroth during the dispute, Gaahl and King had begun preparing a new album. When the new band name was announced in March 2009, it was revealed that the album would be released as the first God Seed album. This debut album was first expected to be released in late 2009, but was later postponed to early 2010. The album was supposed to be released through Indie Recordings, who ostensibly signed Gaahl and King while they were using the name Gorgoroth during the dispute.

By October 2008, everything except the vocals had been recorded for the new album. At certain points in time it was publicly stated by Gaahl and/or other parties that he had begun working on lyrics and vocal arrangements, but apparently on none of these occasions did Gaahl fulfil these. In October 2008, studio times were allocated so Gaahl could begin work, prompting the cancellation of a tour. However, in December 2008 when interviewed by Faceculture, Gaahl implied that he had not yet worked on lyrics and vocal arrangements and intended to do so somepoint after the completion of the European tour with Cradle of Filth while they were still using the Gorgoroth name. In early 2009, Gaahl and his partner Robin went on vacation in Spain for two months. The Norwegian news outlet Nettavisen reported that he had been spending the winter there to help Dan De Vero record his debut album, although the veracity of this story has been in question especially since a day after publication the article was revised with almost all references to Gaahl removed. While Gaahl was abroad, King claimed that he was using this time to work on lyrics and vocal arrangements, but after Gaahl returned from Spain it was stated by King that these had still yet to be done:

We have recorded everything in the studio and are just waiting for Gaahl to put on vocals on it. So we have only vocals and the final mix to go before it's all done. It's sometimes a nightmare to work with him in the studio because of the pride he puts into the smallest details. If he is not in the right mood or doesn't find the correct words we get nothing done. At times I've spent days in the studio counting seconds with nothing happening. It's the same way now, but I know in the end the result will be unique and powerful. We have to wait till Gaahl is done writing his lyrics to choose the title for the album. When the whole concept of this album is done lyrically we’ll decide which title to use.

God Seed performed at the two festivals Hellfest Summer Open Air and With Full Force in summer 2009.

At the With Full Force festival in the beginning of July 2009 Gaahl revealed to Rock Hard that he had quit God Seed, citing his lack of enthusiasm. King later clarified that Gaahl had in fact chosen to retire from metal music, with King eventually forming Ov Hell with Shagrath of Dimmu Borgir and reincorporating the music which was intended to be on the God Seed debut album into his new band, with lyrics written by Shagrath.

Gaahl re-joined God Seed in 2012. In January 2012, Live at Wacken was released, which contains live material (played under the name of Gorgoroth in 2008 at Wacken Open Air, during the name dispute) written by Gaahl and King since 1999 for Gorgoroth.

On 23 October 2012, God Seed released their first studio album I Begin. Three years later, on 15 August 2015, God Seed played their final live show at Motocultor Festival in France.

Band members 
Current members
 Gaahl – vocals (2008-2009, 2012–2015)
 King ov Hell – bass (2008-2009, 2012–2015)
 Stian "Sir" Kårstad – guitar (2012–2015)
 Lust Kilman – guitar (2012–2015)
 Kenneth Kapstad – drums (2012–2015)
 Geir Bratland – keyboards, noise (2012–2015)

Live members
 Teloch – guitar (2008-2009)
 Sir – guitar (2009)
 Garghuf – drums (2009)
 Ice Dale – guitar (2008)
 Nick Barker – drums (2008)

Discography 
Live at Wacken (2012) - live album recorded in 2008
I Begin (2012)

References

External links 
 Official MySpace page
 Official site

Norwegian black metal musical groups
Musical groups established in 2009
Musical groups disestablished in 2009
Musical groups reestablished in 2012
2009 establishments in Norway
2009 disestablishments in Norway
Musical groups from Bergen